Lance Johnstone (born June 11, 1973) is a former American football defensive end.  He was a four-year letterman for Temple University, playing his final three seasons at linebacker and serving as team captain in 1994 and 1995.  He left Temple with the school record in solo tackles with 288 and set a single game school record with 15 solo tackles against Pittsburgh as a junior.  He was drafted in the 1996 NFL Draft by the Oakland Raiders and also played for the Minnesota Vikings from 2001 to 2005 where he accumulated 42 sacks in just five seasons.  He was signed again by Oakland in April 2006. In his 11 NFL seasons, he has only missed nine games.

1973 births
Living people
American football defensive ends
Temple Owls football players
Oakland Raiders players
Minnesota Vikings players
Players of American football from Philadelphia